Advancement and recognition in the Boy Scouts of America is a tradition dating from the inception of the Scouting movement. A fundamental purpose of advancement is the self-confidence a young man or woman acquires from his participation in Scouting. Advancement is one of the methods used in the "Aims of Scouting"– character development, citizenship training and personal fitness.

There are separate advancement and recognition programs for the main program divisions: Cub Scouting (ages six through 10), Scouts BSA (formerly Boy Scouting) (11-17),Venturing (14-20), and Sea Scouting (14-20) (and, formerly, through the now discontinued Varsity Scouting (14-18)). Each program is designed for its age group and goals.

Cub Scouting 

Scouting uses eight methods to fulfill its aims of character development, citizenship training, leadership, and physical fitness. Advancement is one of the eight methods. Cub Scouts use activities call Adventures to earn promotion, following a three step process of: preparation, qualification, and recognition. Cub Scouting is designed to function around the traditional school year with the goal of earning advancement by the end of the year. Youth participate in Cub Scouting from age 5 to 10, working through Lion, Bobcat, Tiger, Wolf, Bear, Webelos, and Arrow of Light.

In addition to the Adventures used to earn promotion, Cub Scouts can work to earn multiple other individual awards though participation in special programs, many of which happen during the summer time. These include Outdoor Activity Award, Shooting Sports Award, World Conservation Award, National Summer Time Pack Award, Whittling Chip (For Bears and Webelos), Cyber-chip, Interpreter Strip, Messenger of Peace, Nova and Supernova, Recruiter Strip, Religious Emblems, and Service Stars.

Scouts BSA

Scouts BSA Advancement 

The advancement program for Scouts BSA (formerly known as Boy Scouting) has two phases.  The first phase of Scout to First Class is designed to teach the Scoutcraft skills, how to participate in a group and to learn self-reliance.  Scout is the joining rank, and is awarded when the Scout demonstrates a rudimentary knowledge of the Scouting ideals.  Tenderfoot, Second Class and First Class have progressively harder requirements in the areas of Scoutcraft, physical fitness, citizenship, personal growth and Scout Spirit.

Focus turns toward individual achievement, leadership and community service once First Class is earned. The ranks of Star, Life and Eagle require a set number of merit badges (minimum of 21 for Eagle Scout, with 13 from a compulsory list), as well as a minimum of time spent in a troop leadership position, and community service requirements, among other things. The rank of Eagle Scout requires the Scout plan, develop and lead their own service project that benefits their community or an organization other than Scouting. In 2010, the Life Scout rank added a specific teaching requirement, where a Star-rank Scout must teach a younger Scout certain requirements for one of the early ranks.

Several religious emblems programs are administered by various religious institutions and recognized by the BSA.  These are generally recognized by a medal and an embroidered square knot.  Many other advancement and recognitions—such as the 50-Miler Award, BSA Aquatics Awards, Outdoor Ethics Awards, Crime Prevention Award, Emergency Preparedness Award and World Conservation Award —are available to Scouts who show performance in special areas.

Scouts may earn the Den Chief Service Award for their service as a Cub Scout Den Chief.

There are also several positions of responsibility within each troop, which is usually divided into patrols, with patrol leaders and assistant patrol leaders. The troop itself has a senior patrol leader as its youth leader, along with an assistant senior patrol leader, and several other positions of responsibility, such as scribe, quartermaster, librarian, instructor, historian and chaplain's aide. Holding some sort of responsibility in the troop is a requirement for higher advancement ranks.

Order of the Arrow 

The Order of the Arrow (OA) is a program of the Boy Scout division of the Boy Scouts of America (BSA).  It is the BSA's national honor society for experienced campers, based on American Indian traditions, and dedicated to the ideal of cheerful service.

Awards are separate and distinct from the membership levels of Ordeal and Brotherhood. Awards available through the Order of the Arrow include: Vigil Honor, Founder's Award, Distinguished Service Award, Lifetime Achievement Award, Red Arrow Award, E. Urner Goodman Camping Award, E. Urner Goodman, Scholarship Fund, National Service Award. Scholastic awards are also available to Arrowmen to aid in education expenses.

Varsity Scouting 

Advancement was a key part of the Varsity program.  Varsity Scouts could earn any award or recognition that were available to Boy Scouts, including merit badges, ranks advancements, and other awards.  There were also several awards that were only available to Varsity Scouts, and sometimes their leaders.  Due to the decision by the Church of Jesus Christ of Latter-Day Saints to cease participation in the Varsity Scouting program, the Boy Scouts of America decided to end the Varsity Scouting program, effective January 1, 2018.

Venturing

Youth advancement 

A Bronze Award may be earned for each category of arts and hobbies, outdoor, community and religious life, sea Scouting and sports.  After earning at least one Bronze Award and meeting tenure, leadership, personal growth and other requirements the Venturer may earn the Gold Award.  To earn the Silver Award, the Venturer must earn the Gold Award, earn first aid and CPR certifications, show leadership and participate in ethics training.

Venturers may also earn expert awards that build on some areas of the Bronze Awards.
These include the Venturing Ranger Award (Outdoors);
the TRUST Award (Community and Religious Life);
the Quest Award (Sports);
and the Quartermaster Award (Sea Scouting).

Male members under the age of 18 may also earn Merit Badges and the Star, Life, and Eagle Scout ranks from the Boy Scouting program if they have earned at least First Class rank in a Boy Scout troop or Varsity Scout team.

Venturing Leadership Award 

Both youth and adults are eligible for the Venturing Leadership Award. There are three levels of these awards: council (for those at the crew, district, and/or council levels), region (for those at the area or region levels) and National. A limited number of these awards are presented on an annual basis to those involved in Venturing who have made exceptional contributions to Venturing at their particular level and who exemplify the Venturing Code.  These awards are similar in scope to the Silver Beaver Award, Silver Antelope Award, and Silver Buffalo Award.

Sea Scouting 
In Sea Scouts, the traditional advancement program consists of the 4 ranks in the following order Apprentice, Ordinary, Able, and finally Quartermaster.  Quartermaster is the highest Sea Scout Rank and is equivalent to Eagle Scout or Venturing Silver Award.

SEAL Training, (Sea Scout Experience Advanced Leadership Training ), is the highest level of Leadership Training.  The program originated in 1996 and at the time was under the name of Sea Exploring, however in 1998 when Venturing was formed the organization was known as Sea Scouts.  The name SEAL training did not change.  There are about 4-6 course per year held around the country.  Participants age over 14.5 to less than 18 years old.  Participants must have earned the rank of Ordinary before attending the course.  Approximately 80% of participants pass the course.  The course is similar to NAYLE or what was previously known as NJLIC.  Upon successful graduation from the course the student may wear the SEAL Pin on their uniform.  This is the only youth earned pin that an Adult may wear.

Sea Scouts may choose to earn any Venturing awards, advancement, and training if they wish to. A male Sea Scout who has earned the rank of 1st Class in a Boy Scout Troop may complete further Boy Scout ranks and training from within his Sea Scout Ship.

Religious awards 
 Youth Religious Emblem
 Adult Religious Award

Lifesaving and meritorious action awards 
BSA's National Court of Honor is responsible for lifesaving and meritorious awards. All Courts of Honor for Eagle Scout rank are convened as National Courts of Honor also.

Honor Medal With Crossed Palms
A lifesaving award presented to a registered BSA member (youth or adult leader) who has demonstrated both unusual heroism and extraordinary skill or resourcefulness in saving or attempting to save a life at extreme risk to self; may be awarded posthumously.
Honor Medal
A lifesaving award presented to a registered BSA member (youth or adult leader) who has demonstrated unusual heroism in saving or attempting to save a life at considerable risk to self.
Heroism Award
A lifesaving award presented to a registered BSA member (youth or adult leader) who has demonstrated heroism and skill in saving or attempting to save life at minimal personal risk.
Medal of Merit
Awarded to BSA members (youth or adult leaders) who have performed an outstanding act of service and exceptional character by putting into practice Scouting skills and ideals. It does not need to involve risk to self.
National Certificate of Merit
This award may be presented by the National Court of Honor to a registered BSA member (youth or adult leader) who has performed a significant act of service that is deserving of special national recognition. Such action need not involve attempts of rescue or risk to self, but puts into practice Scouting skills or ideals.
Local Council Certificate of Merit (No. 606760)
This may be awarded by local BSA councils for individual meritorious actions by a registered BSA member (youth or adult leader) that do not merit national recognition.

Nova and Supernova Awards 
These STEM (Science, Technology, Engineering and Math) awards are for all three levels of youth scouting.  Cub Scouts, Boy Scouts and Venturers may all earn up to four Nova awards, each based on one of the four STEM principles.  The Supernova award is a culmination of the youth's work on the Nova award and there are a number of various Supernova awards that the scout may earn.

Adult leader awards

Cub Scout leader recognition 
Cub Scout leaders who complete training, tenure, and performance requirements are recognized by a system of awards.  The Cub Scout Den Leader Training Award is available for Den Leaders, the Scouter's Training Award is for any registered Cub Scout leader, and the Scouter's Key is for Cubmasters.  These awards are recognized by a certificate and an embroidered square knot insignia with the appropriate square knot device pin (indicates program or rank for which the award was earned).

Boy Scout leader recognition 
Boy Scout adult leaders who complete training, tenure, and performance requirements are recognized by a system of awards. The Boy Scout Leader's Training Award is available to any leader, while the Scoutmaster's Key and the Scoutmaster Award of Merit are only available to the Scoutmaster.

Varsity Scout leader recognition 
The Boy Scouts of America ended the Varsity Scouting program, effective January 1, 2018.

Adult Varsity leaders were able to earn the Varsity Letter and activity pins.  They met the same requirements as the youth and also had to complete Fast Start and Basic Leader Training (New Leader Essentials and Varsity Coach Leader Specific Training), attend six Varsity Roundtables, and complete a minimum of six months tenure.

Varsity Scout leaders who completed tenure, training and performance requirements were able to earn the Varsity Scout Leader Training Award.  Varsity Coaches were able to earn the Varsity Coach's Key and the National President's Varsity Scout Coach Award of Merit.

Venturing leader recognition 
Venturing adult leaders who complete training, tenure, and performance requirements are recognized by a system of awards. The Venturing Leader's Training Award is available to any leader, while the Venturing Advisor's Key and Venturing Advisor Award of Merit are only available to the Advisor.

Sea Scout leader recognition 
Sea Scout adult leaders who complete training, tenure, and performance requirements are recognized by a system of awards. The Sea Scout Leader's Training Award (part of the Scouter's Training Award series) is available to any leader, while the Skipper's Key is only available to Skippers.  Seabadge is an advanced leadership program for all Sea Scout leaders.  Seabadge can be worn as a pin or a knot with a single trident.  Unofficial knots with multiple tridents are sometimes worn to represent a staff member or course director.

Sea Scout adult leaders may also wear the SEAL pin if they, earned it as a youth, served as course director, or served as a course director's mate.

Sea Scout adult leaders may also receive the Venturing Leadership Award

Commissioner recognition 
Commissioners who complete training, tenure, and performance requirements are recognized by a system of awards. The Arrowhead Honor is for commissioners who exhibit quality performance and leadership.  The Roundtable Staff Training Award (part of the Scouter's Training Award series) is available to Cub Scout, Boy Scout, Varsity Scout and Venturing roundtable staff.  The Commissioner's Key (part of the Scouter's Key series) is available for roundtable commissioners, district commissioner, assistant district commissioners, unit commissioners, council commissioners and assistant council commissioners.  The Distinguished Commissioner Service Award recognizes commissioners who provide quality service over a period of at least five years.

Scouter's Training Award 
The Scouter's Training Award is a set of recognitions for leaders who complete tenure, training and performance requirements.
 Cub Scout Leader's Training Award for the Cubmaster, Den Leaders, pack committee chairman and pack committee members
 Boy Scout Leader's Training Award for the Scoutmaster, assistant Scoutmasters, troop committee chairman and troop committee members
 Venturing Leader's Training Award for the Advisor, associate Advisors, crew committee chairman and crew committee members
 Sea Scout Leader's Training Award for the Skipper, mates, ship committee chairman and ship committee members
 Roundtable Staff Training Award for the Cub Scout, Boy Scout, Varsity Scout and Venturing roundtable staff
 Professional Scouter Training Award

Scouter's Key 
The Scouter's Key is a set of recognitions for primary unit leaders who complete advanced tenure, training and performance requirements.
 Cubmaster's Key
 Scoutmaster's Key
 Venturing Advisor's Key
 Commissioner's Key for roundtable commissioners, district commissioner, assistant district commissioners, unit commissioners, council commissioners and assistant council commissioner
 District Committee's Key for the district committee chairman and members

Unit Leader Award of Merit 
The Unit Leader Award of Merit is for Cubmasters, Scoutmasters, Venturing Crew Advisors, and Sea Scout Skippers who meet 7 requirements for tenure, personal training, unit quality and youth training.
 Cubmaster Award of Merit
 Scoutmaster Award of Merit
 Venturing Crew Advisor Award of Merit
 Sea Scout Skipper Award of Merit

Leadership and training awards 
 Powderhorn
 Wood Badge
 Sea Badge

Distinguished service awards 
Distinguished service awards are presented at various levels to recognize noteworthy and extraordinary service to youth.
 District Award of Merit – district level
 Silver Beaver Award – council level
 Silver Antelope Award – regional level
 Silver Buffalo Award – national level
 Silver World Award – international level
 National Eagle Scout Association Outstanding Eagle Scout Award – council to regional level
 Distinguished Eagle Scout Award – national level

Service awards 
 International Scouter's Award
 Community Organization Award
 AFL–CIO George Meany Award (is also part of this category, but retains the use of its original square knot)
 Alpha Phi Omega Herbert G. Horton Service to Youth Award
 American Legion Scouting Square Knot Award 
 Benevolent and Protective Order of Elks (BPOE) Marvin M. Lewis Award 
 International Fellowship of Scouting Rotarians (IFSR) Cliff Dochterman Award, (Rotary)
 Masonic Daniel Carter Beard Scouter Award, (Masons)
 National Society of the Sons of the American Revolution Robert E. Burt Boy Scout Volunteer Award,
 Ruritan National Service Clubs Scout Leader Community Service Award,
 United States Power Squadrons Raymond A. Finley, Jr. Sea Scout Service Award,
 VFW Scouter's Achievement Award,
 United States Military Outstanding Volunteer Service Medal, U.S. DoD

National service awards 
Whitney Young Service Award
Named after Whitney M Young Jr., and recognizes outstanding services by an adult individual or an organization for demonstrated involvement in the development and implementation of Scouting opportunities for youth from rural or low-income urban backgrounds.
¡Scouting ... Vale la pena! Service Award
Recognizes outstanding services by an adult individual or an organization for demonstrated involvement in the development and implementation of Scouting opportunities for Hispanic American/Latino youth.
Asian American Spirit of Scouting Service Award
Recognizes outstanding services by an adult individual or an organization for demonstrated involvement in the development and implementation of Scouting opportunities for Asian American youth.
 Dr. Frank 'Tick' Coleman National Service Award
A National Service Award for full-time paraprofessional Scouters working in Scoutreach given every other year, named in honor of Dr. Frank "Tick" Coleman.  Dr. Coleman was highly involved in ScoutReach.

Support of Scouting awards 
 James E West Fellowship Award
 1910 Society
 Ernest Thompson Seton, Daniel Carter Beard, Theodore Roosevelt and Waite Phillips levels
 Founder's Circle
 Bronze, Silver, Gold and Platinum levels
 William D. Boyce New-Unit Organizer Award

Square knot system 

Adult leaders display their awards on their uniform through a system of square knots above the left uniform pocket, much as a member of the military would with their ribbons.  The knots are as follows:

 Alumni Award (red, yellow and blue knot with gold border)
 Arrow of Light Award (red and green knot with yellow border)
 Asian American Spirit of Scouting Service Award (white and black knot with purple border)
 Community Organization Award (yellow knot on dark blue background)
 Cub Scout Den Leader Award (yellow knot on blue background)
 Cub Scouter Award (blue knot on yellow background)
 Distinguished Commissioner Service Award (silver knot on red background)
 District Award of Merit (silver overhand knot on blue background)
 Doctorate of Commissioner Science Award (silver knot on red background with blue border)
 Eagle Scout (red, white and blue knot)
 George Meany Award (blue knot on red and white background)
 Heroism Award (red knot on white background)
 Honor Medal (red knot)
 International Scouter's Award (purple and white knot)
 James E. West Fellowship Award (yellow and green knot with red border)
 Medal of Merit (yellow and blue knot)
 NESA life membership (red, white and blue Eagle Scout knot with silver border)
 Order of the Arrow Distinguished Service Award: (silver knot on red background)
 Philmont Training Center Masters Track Award (red knot on yellow background)
 Professional Training Award (black knot on white background)
 Religious emblems of faith
 Adult (purple knot on silver background)
 Youth (purple knot on silver background)
 Scouter's Key (green and white knot)
 Scouter's Training Award (green knot)
 ¡Scouting...Vale la Pena! Service Award (laurel green and white knot on red background)
 Scoutmaster or Venturing Advisor Award of Merit (white knot)
 Sea Scout Quartermaster Award (navy blue knot on white background)
 Seabadge (trident)
 Silver Antelope Award (white and yellow knot)
 Silver Beaver Award (white and blue knot)
 Silver Buffalo Award (white and red knot)
 Silver World Award (blue and silver globe on red-and-white striped background)
 Speakers Bank Award (red knot on yellow background)
 Venturing Summit Award (previously silver award, silver knot on green and white background)
 Venturing Leadership Award (silver knot on green, red and blue background)
 Webelos Den Leader Award (yellow knot on yellow background)
 Whitney M. Young Jr. Award (white and black knot with red border)
 William D. Boyce New-Unit Organizer Award (silver knot on yellow, green and red background)
Tiger Cub Den Leader Award (orange and black knot on yellow background)

Know Your Boy Scouts Square Knots

Memorials 
 Spirit of the Eagle Award

Unit awards 
 National Den Award
 National Summertime Pack Award
 Journey To Excellence (JTE) Award (formerly National Quality Unit Award)
 Veteran Unit Award
 BSA Ready & Prepared Award

Scholarships 

 American Legion Eagle Scout of the Year Scholarship
 Eastern Orthodox Committee on Scouting scholarships
 Emmett J. Doerr Memorial Scout Scholarship for Catholic Scouts
 National Eagle Scout Association (NESA) scholarships
 Mervyn Sluizer Jr. Scholarship for Philadelphia-area Scouts
 National Jewish Committee on Scouting Eagle Scout Scholarship Programs
 Sons of the American Revolution (SAR) Arthur M. & Berdena King Eagle Scout Scholarship
 Veterans of Foreign Wars (VFW) Scout of the Year Scholarship
 William M. Minto Memorial Scholarship For Sea Scouts
 The E. Urner Goodman Scholarship program has been suspended and is no longer available.

Wood Badge Scholarships for Scouters
 AFL-CIO Wood Badge Scholarship Program
 VFW Wood Badge Scholarship Program
 some American Legion Departments (e.g., North Carolina, Pennsylvania, Illinois, etc.) offer Wood Badge Scholarships

Special opportunities 
Aquatics
 Boardsailing BSA
 Kayaking BSA
 Mile Swim BSA
 Scuba BSA
 Snorkeling BSA
 Stand Up Paddleboarding BSA
 Whitewater Rafting BSA
 BSA Lifeguard

Sea Scout Specific Awards
 Long Cruise
 Qualified Seaman
 Small Boat Handler

Conservation
 The Conservation Good Turn Award for Cub Scout Packs, Scout Troops and Venturing Crews
 Cub Scout World Conservation Award
 Boy Scout World Conservation Award
 Venturing World Conservation Award
 Outdoor Ethics Awareness Award
 Outdoor Ethics Action Award
 William T. Hornaday Awards
 William T. Hornaday Unit Award
 William T. Hornaday Badge – Scouts
 William T. Hornaday Gold Medal – Scouters
 William T. Hornaday Bronze Medal – Scouts
 William T. Hornaday Silver Medal – Scouts
 William T. Hornaday Gold Badge – Scouters
 William T. Hornaday Gold Certificate – organizations or individuals

Disabilities
 Torch of Gold Certificate – To recognize youth and adult members who have provided outstanding service in the area of Scouts with special needs
 Woods Services Award – A national-level recognition for volunteer adults who provide outstanding service to Scouts with special needs

Emergency Preparedness

 Crime Prevention Awards
 Emergency Preparedness Award

Outdoors
 Cub Scout Outdoor Activity Award
 50-Miler Award
 Historic Trails Award
 National Medal for Outdoor Achievement
 National Outdoor Challenge Unit Award

Scoutcraft
 Firem'n Chit
 Paul Bunyan Woodsman
 Totin' Chip
 Whittlin' Chip

Tenure
 Service stars
 Veteran Scouter Pin

Other
 BSA Family Award – Cub Scouts
 BSA Donor Awareness Patch
 BSA Hometown U.S.A. Award
 International Activity Patch
 Interpreter's Strips (17 languages including ASL and Morse Code)
 Recruiter Strip – all Scouts

Awards from other organizations 
 Alpha Phi Omega offers the Scouting Recognition Certificate
 The American Legion offers the Eagle Scout of the Year Award
 The United States Department of Defense offers the Youth Certificate of Recognition

Awards no longer in use 
These awards are no longer awarded, but may be worn by those who earned them:
 BSA Physical Fitness Award
 BSA Ready and Prepared Award
 BSA Young American Award
 Cub Scout Leave No Trace Awareness Award
 Den Mother's Training Award- awarded from 1956, renamed to Den Leader's Training Award in 1967
 Den Leader Coach Training Award- awarded from 1967 to 2006, replaced by the Pack Trainer Award
 Explorer Silver- awarded from 1949 to 1964
 Explorer Achievement Award- awarded from 1981 to 1995, replaced by the Explorer  G.O.L.D. Award
 Explorer  G.O.L.D. Award- awarded from 1995 to 1998
 Explorer Ranger Award- awarded from 1944 to 1949
 Explorer Ace Award- awarded from 1942 to 1954
 Heroism Award- a lifesaving award presented to a registered youth member or adult leader who has demonstrated heroism in saving or attempting to save a life at minimum risk to self
 National Camping Award- replaced by the National Outdoor Challenge Unit Award in 2010
 Silver Fawn Award- equivalent of the Silver Beaver Award for female leaders issued from 1971 to 1974
 Tiger Cub Coach Award— renamed to Tiger Cub Den Leader Award
 Varsity Scout Leader's Training Award for the Coach, assistant Coaches, team committee chairman, team committee member
 Varsity Scout Coach's Key
 William H. Spurgeon III Award – moved to Exploring (Learning for Life)

References

Sources 
 scouting.org – The official BSA Website for Scouting in the US.
 MeritBadge.Org – is a Wikipedia that provides resources to Scouts and leaders in the US.
 USScouts.Org – another volunteer site that provides resources to Scouts and leaders in the US.

Footnotes